The Goonies is a 1985 American adventure comedy film co-produced and directed by Richard Donner from a screenplay by Chris Columbus, based on a story by Steven Spielberg, and starring Sean Astin, Josh Brolin, Jeff Cohen, Corey Feldman, Kerri Green, Martha Plimpton, and Ke Huy Quan with supporting roles done by John Matuszak, Robert Davi, Anne Ramsey, and Joe Pantoliano. In the film, a group of kids who live in the "Goon Docks" neighborhood of Astoria, Oregon, attempt to save their homes from foreclosure and, in doing so, they discover an old treasure map that takes them on an adventure to unearth the long-lost fortune of One-Eyed Willy, a legendary 17th-century pirate. During the adventure, they are chased by a family of criminals who want the treasure for themselves.

Produced by Spielberg's Amblin Entertainment, Warner Bros. released the film theatrically on June 7, 1985, in the United States. The film grossed $125 million worldwide on a budget of $19 million and has since become a cult film. In 2017, the film was selected for preservation in the United States National Film Registry by the Library of Congress as being "culturally, historically, or aesthetically significant".

Plot

Facing foreclosure of their homes in the "Goon Docks" area of Astoria, Oregon, to an expanding country club, a group of children who call themselves "the Goonies" (Mikey Walsh, Data, Mouth, and Chunk) gather for a final weekend together.

Rummaging through the Walshes' attic, they come across a 1632 doubloon and an old treasure map purporting to lead to the treasure of legendary pirate "One-Eyed Willy", believed to be located somewhere nearby. Mikey considers One-Eyed Willy to be the original Goonie. Seeing the treasure as their last chance to save their homes, the kids overpower and bind Mikey's older brother Brand and make their way to an abandoned restaurant on the coast that coincides with the map. Brand soon follows alongside Andy, a cheerleader with a crush on him; and Stef, Andy's friend.

The group eventually discovers that the derelict restaurant is a hideout of the Fratelli crime family: Francis, Jake, and their mother. The Goonies find a tunnel in the basement and follow it, but Chunk leaves to alert the police. When Chunk flags down a motorist to go to the sheriff's station, he gets abducted by the Fratellis and imprisoned with their hulking, deformed, younger brother Sloth. The Fratellis interrogate Chunk until he reveals where the Goonies have gone, and begin pursuit. Chunk is left behind with Sloth, and befriends him. After Sloth frees both of them, Chunk calls the sheriff, who thinks it's another one of Chunk's tall tales. Chunk and Sloth follow the trail of the Fratellis.

The Goonies evade several deadly booby traps along the tunnels, while barely staying ahead of the Fratellis. They finally reach the grotto where Willy's pirate ship, The Inferno, is anchored. The group discovers that the ship is filled with treasure, and they start filling their pockets, but Mikey warns them not to take any on a set of scales in front of Willy's skeleton, considering that to be their tribute to him.

As the Goonies are planning their escape, the Fratellis appear and strip them of their loot. The Fratellis start to bind the Goonies' hands and make them walk the plank, until Chunk and Sloth arrive and distract the Fratellis long enough for the Goonies to jump overboard and swim to safety. Brand saves Andy from drowning and they kiss. The Fratellis proceed to grab all the treasure they can, including those on Willy's scales; this triggers another booby trap which causes the grotto to cave in. With Sloth's help, the Goonies and Fratellis barely escape.

The two groups emerge on Astoria's beach, where the Goonies reunite with their families and the police. The Fratellis are arrested, but Chunk prevents Sloth from also being taken; he invites Sloth to live with him, which Sloth accepts. Just as Mikey’s father is about to sign the foreclosure papers, the Walshes' housekeeper Rosalita discovers that Mikey's marble bag is filled with gems he took from the ship that had not been seized by the Fratellis. Mikey's father triumphantly rips up the papers, declaring that they have enough money to negate the foreclosure.

As the Goonies are recounting the tale of their adventure to the disbelieving press and police, everyone's attention is drawn to the Inferno, having broken free of the grotto, sailing off majestically on its own in the distance.

Cast

 Sean Astin as Michael "Mikey" Walsh, the asthmatic leader of the Goonies
 Josh Brolin as Brandon "Brand" Walsh, a high-school athlete and Mikey's older brother and minder
 Jeff Cohen as Lawrence "Chunk" Cohen, a clumsy, gluttonous member of the Goonies and habitual fabulist
 Corey Feldman as Clark "Mouth" Devereaux, a Goonie nicknamed for his cheeky tongue
 Ke Huy Quan as Richard "Data" Wang, a James Bond fanatic and amateur gadgeteer Goonie
 Kerri Green as Andrea Theresa "Andy" Carmichael, a high-school cheerleader and Brand's love interest
 Martha Plimpton as Stephanie "Stef" Steinbrenner, a tomboy and Andy's best friend
 Anne Ramsey as Mama Fratelli, an Italian-born crime matriarch of her family
 Robert Davi as Jake Fratelli, Mama Fratelli's son, a counterfeiter and a recently-escaped fugitive who escapes from police custody as seen at the beginning of the film
 Joe Pantoliano as Francis Fratelli, Mama Fratelli's favorite son who wears glasses and a hairpiece
 John Matuszak as Lotney "Sloth" Fratelli, the deformed and abused, but child-hearted, son of Mama Fratelli whom Chunk befriends
 Mary Ellen Trainor as Irene Walsh, Mikey and Brand's fussy mother
 Keith Walker as Irving Walsh, Mikey and Brand's father and a curator at the local history museum
 Lupe Ontiveros as Rosalita, the Walsh family's Mexican housekeeper who can only speak Spanish
 Curt Hanson as Elgin Perkins, Troy's millionaire father and proprietor of Astoria Country Club who is behind the foreclosures at the "Goon Docks"
 Steve Antin as Troy Perkins, the spoiled son of Elgin Perkins who is Brand's rival for Andy's attention
 Paul Tuerpe as the Sheriff
 George Robotham as a prison guard who gets fooled by Jake's fake suicide
 Michael Paul Chan as Mr. Wang, Data's father who is also a James Bond fanatic and gadgeteer

Director Richard Donner makes an uncredited cameo appearance as a sheriff's deputy. The film's cinematographer Nick McLean also has a cameo as Mouth's father. The part of the dead FBI agent was performed by stuntman Ted Grossman.

Production 

Principal photography on The Goonies began on October 22, 1984, and lasted five months. An additional six weeks of audio dubbing and recording were used. The shooting script was lengthy, at more than 120 pages, to which several sequences were eventually cut from the final theatrical version. During the film's dénouement, mention is made of an octopus, which refers to a scene that was excised from the final cut.

In the documentary The Making of The Goonies, Richard Donner noted both the difficulties and pleasures of working with so many child actors. He praised them for their energy and excitement, but also said that they were also unruly when brought together. As a result, the documentary frequently showed him coaching the actors and revealing some techniques he used to create realistic performances. One of these tricks involved One-Eyed Willy's pirate ship, which was actually a full-sized replica of a pirate ship created under the direction of production designer J. Michael Riva. Donner restricted the actors from seeing the ship until they filmed the scene wherein it is revealed to their characters; the characters' first glimpse of the ship was also the actors' first view of it, bringing about a more realistic performance. However, that particular scene in the final cut was actually the second take, due to the cast feeling so overwhelmed at first sight that the scene had to be reshot. The entire set was scrapped after shooting because they could not find anyone who wanted it.

In his book There and Back Again, Sean Astin claimed that Donner and  Spielberg were "like co-directors" on the film as he compared and contrasted their styles when directing scenes.

Some of the on-location filming was done in Astoria. The interior and exterior of the old Clatsop County Jail features as the holding place of Jake Fratelli at the start of the film. (The building was later converted into the Oregon Film Museum, which opened on the 25th anniversary of The Goonies with memorabilia from this and other local films.) The museum where Mikey's father works is, in reality, the Captain George Flavel House Museum. The Walsh family home is a real home on the eastern end of the town. The road leading to the home was closed to tours in 2015. The scenes along the coast were filmed in Oregon, but they were a considerable distance from Astoria. The Goonies bicycle to Ecola State Park (in reality, over 26 miles south of Astoria) and then find the starting location of the map using Haystack Rock as a guide. Underground scenes were filmed at Warner Bros. Studios in Burbank, California, including the cavernous set where the Goonies find One-Eyed Willy's ship, which was in Stage 16, one of the largest sound stages in the United States. The final scene was shot at Goat Rock State Beach in Sonoma County, California.

The film also marked Wes Takahashi's first major motion picture as an animation supervisor for Industrial Light & Magic.

Music and soundtrack 

The Goonies: Original Motion Picture Soundtrack features music by Cyndi Lauper, REO Speedwagon, The Bangles, and others. The cast members (except Kerri Green) appeared alongside professional wrestlers "Rowdy" Roddy Piper, The Iron Sheik, Nikolai Volkoff, and "Captain" Lou Albano (who previously appeared in her "Girls Just Wanna Have Fun" video) in the 12-minute "The Goonies 'R' Good Enough" music video. Steven Spielberg makes a cameo appearance. Lauper also has a cameo in the film, performing the song on TV, although the song was not completed until after filming.

Dave Grusin's score was unavailable for 25 years. The main theme, "Fratelli Chase",  has been used in numerous trailers, such as Innerspace, Scrooged, and Guarding Tess, and was re-recorded by Grusin and the London Symphony Orchestra for the album Cinemagic. The score makes liberal use of the Max Steiner-composed theme from Adventures of Don Juan.

Soundtrack label Varèse Sarabande released the score on CD in March 2010 in a limited edition of 5,000 copies. The company reissued the score on CD as a wide release in June 2019, but with the previous CD's four bonus tracks omitted.

Release 
Warner Bros. released the film in cinemas across the United States on June 7, 1985.

Home media 
The Goonies was first released on VHS and Betamax video in the United States in March 1986 and the LaserDisc and CED versions also debuted that year. Warner Home Video released a theatrical widescreen laserdisc on January 29, 1992. Warner Home Video released The Goonies in widescreen on Region 1 DVD on August 21, 2001. Warner Home Video released The Goonies on Blu-ray Disc in October 2008 in Europe and November 2010 in North America. The video is in 1080p high-definition VC-1 and accompanied by a Dolby TrueHD soundtrack. Warner released the film on Ultra HD Blu-ray in September 2020 in North America.

Reception

Critical response 
Review aggregator Rotten Tomatoes reports that 76% of critics have given the film a positive review based on 62 reviews and 91% of the audience giving it a positive review; the average rating is 6.5/10. The critical consensus: "The Goonies is an energetic, sometimes noisy mix of Spielbergian sentiment and fun-house tricks that will appeal to kids and nostalgic adults alike." At Metacritic it has a rating score of 62 based on 13 reviews, indicating "generally favorable reviews".

Roger Ebert gave the film three stars out of four and called the film "a smooth mixture of the usual ingredients from Steven Spielberg action movies, made special because of the high-energy performances of the kids who have the adventures." Gene Siskel of the Chicago Tribune also awarded three stars out of four and wrote that after a dull start "some kind of minor movie miracle takes place, and The Goonies gets its act together as the kids stop trading wisecracks and get closer to finding their long-lost pirate treasure, thereby to help save their parents' homes. Only then do we accept The Goonies for what it is—a funny juvenile windup toy about kids in perilous, comic-book situations." Janet Maslin of The New York Times wrote that the film "has a kind of breakneck pacing that keeps it fast, funny, ingenious, entertaining, and — only a small point while the movie is in progress — almost entirely without staying power." Variety called it "a dangerous Disneyland sort of a film stamped with the Steven Spielberg style of high fun. Like other Spielberg summer extravaganzas, pic is a roller coaster ride best enjoyed as it's speeding along. Once it stops to consider the sacred state of adolescence, it becomes painfully syrupy." Michael Wilmington of the Los Angeles Times wrote that the film "resembles nothing so much as a wildly exaggerated fun-fair ride, one that keeps comically exposing you to dangers, comically pulling you away, then, finally, with a shivering plop, deposits you on dry land, in the bosom of your family." Paul Attanasio of The Washington Post called it "an artfully crafted movie, thrumming with energy and sometimes wit, and utterly uninvolving for anyone over the age of 12." Colin Greenland reviewed The Goonies for White Dwarf and stated, "The Goonies I was unable to enjoy because of a bunch of kids yelling and screaming all the way through. Not the audience, the actors."

Box office 
The Goonies grossed $9 million in its opening weekend in the U.S., second on the charts behind Rambo: First Blood Part II. It grossed $63.9 million in the United States and Canada, placing it among the top-10 highest-grossing films of 1985 and $60.6 million overseas for a worldwide gross of $125 million.

Awards 
Ramsey won a Saturn Award for Best Supporting Actress for her role as "Mama" Fratelli. At the 7th Youth in Film Awards (now known as Young Artist Awards), Astin's portrayal of Mikey won the award for Best Starring Performance By a Young Actor in a Motion Picture. Cohen, Feldman, and Plimpton were also nominated for awards for their performances in The Goonies. The film itself was nominated for best adventure motion picture.

Legacy 
Special anniversary events for the film, hosted by the city of Astoria, have drawn about 10,000 to 15,000 visitors. The home used for the Walsh family has become a tourist attraction, receiving between 1,200 and 1,500 visitors a day during the summer of the 30th anniversary. As a result, in August 2015, the residents and owners of the home, their neighbors, and the city of Astoria took steps to limit public access to the home.

Video games 
Datasoft produced a Goonies video game for Commodore 64, Atari 8-bit family, and Apple II in 1985, which was later ported to the ZX Spectrum and Amstrad CPC by U.S. Gold. This game features eight screens in which a player had to use two members of the Goonies group to solve puzzles and reach an exit to advance to the next stage. The screens were largely inspired by actual sets and puzzles seen in the film. A reference to the aforementioned "octopus scene" is included, as the seventh level.

In 1986, Japanese game developer Konami created two versions of The Goonies for the MSX (The Goonies) in Japan and Europe, and Family Computer (The Goonies)  in Japan. The Goonies II was also released on the Famicom (and its international counterpart, the Nintendo Entertainment System). The Goonies II was released in North America, Europe, and Australia, although the original was one of the NES games released as part of the Nintendo VS. System arcade machine in the 1980s. The Goonies II has little to do with the film. In it, the Fratellis have kidnapped all the Goonies (except Mikey, whom the player guides) and have hidden them in cages across a terrain of caverns, mazes, and abandoned buildings. As Mikey, the player must rescue them all and ultimately free a mermaid named Annie.  Mikey was also a playable character in Konami's 1988 Famicom title Wai Wai World, which included a Goonies-themed level.

In February 2007, Chrysler's Jeep division sponsored The Goonies: Return to Astoria, a Flash-based online game developed by Fuel Industries. The player's goal is to collect map pieces and doubloons, and then race the Fratellis to One-Eyed Willy's treasure.

A Goonies level pack for Lego Dimensions was released on May 9, 2017. The pack includes a Sloth minifigure, who is able to change into the other Goonies, and constructable Pirate Ship and Skeleton Organ, and unlocks a bonus level that adapts the plot of the film from the perspective of him and Chunk.

Cancelled sequels and adaptations 

The possibility of a film sequel has been confirmed and denied many times over the years by the original cast and crew. Donner said that he had a story he liked and Spielberg behind him, but in 2004, several of the actors from the original revealed that Warner Bros., the film's owner, had shown no interest in a sequel. Sean Astin told MTV in October 2007 that Goonies 2 "is an absolute certainty ... The writing's on the wall when they're releasing the DVD in such numbers." Donner has expressed doubt that a sequel will ever happen, as many of the actors had not shown interest in returning for one. Corey Feldman stated in his November 25, 2008 blog post, "NO! There is no Goonies 2! I'm sorry but it's just not gonna happen .... Course now that I've said that, they'll do it." However, on the July 2010 release of The Making of a Cult Classic: The Unauthorized Story of The Goonies DVD, Richard Donner states a sequel to The Goonies is a "definite thing" and will involve as much of the old cast as possible. "It will happen," says Donner. "We've been trying for a number of years." On April 5, 2014, Richard Donner revealed a sequel is in the works, and he hopes to bring back the entire cast. In the 2020 reunion event, Spielberg stated "Chris, Dick and I — and Lauren [Shuler Donner] — have had a lot of conversations about [a sequel]...Every couple of years we come up with an idea but then it doesn't hold water." In May 2021, Feldman stated that despite Columbus saying that he is writing a sequel, the chances for a sequel are "dead" as Donner had chosen to direct Lethal Finale as his final film, and the cast did not want to return if Donner was not involved. Donner died almost two months later, making the chances of a sequel even less likely.

Rumors of adaptations and sequels in other media took off in 2007, including a comic-book miniseries, an animated television series and a musical adaptation of the film. Corey Feldman said he was asked to reprise the role of Mouth in an animated series that would feature the original Goonies characters as adults and focus on the adventures of a new set of kids. Apparently, this project was briefly in the works for Cartoon Network before being shelved.  Entertainment Weekly reported in March 2007 on a potential musical adaptation of the film. "Steven and I have discussed it, and it's something that I'm fairly passionate about right now," Donner says. Variety reported in October 2008 that Donner had met with Broadway entertainment attorney John Breglio, and is "confident things are moving in the right direction." As of May 2011, the musical was still in the beginning stages, but Donner was hopeful that an "irreverent" script would be completed by October.

On February 12, 2020, Fox ordered a pilot for a drama series from Sarah Watson, creator of The Bold Type, about a woman helping film students create a shot-for-shot remake of The Goonies. Greg Mottola is attached as director, and as executive producer along with Richard Donner and his wife, Lauren Shuler Donner. On May 7, 2021, Fox announced that the pilot would not be moving forward. On December 15, 2021, Disney+ picked up the series for development now titled Our Time.

Reunion 
On April 27, 2020, through his YouTube channel, Josh Gad aired a virtual cast reunion via Zoom as the first episode of Gad's "Reunited Apart", a charity fundraising effort during the COVID-19 pandemic, with the Goonies reunion supporting the Center for Disaster Philanthropy. All of the living primary cast participated, with the event dedicated to the cast members who have since died. In addition to the cast, director Richard Donner, producer Steven Spielberg, and writer Chris Columbus were also present, and even Cyndi Lauper made an appearance.

On December 5, 2020, the cast had another virtual reunion, this time for a live reading of the full movie script that was broadcast on multiple social media outlets. The characters whose original actors had died were played by other actors including Josh Gad as Sloth, Jean Smart as Mama Fratelli, and Kristen Bell as Irene Walsh. Cary Elwes served as the narrator. The event earned over $130,000 in donations for the charity No Kid Hungry.

See also

 Cliff Hanger, a 1983 arcade laserdisc video game featured in the film; the game itself is based on Hayao Miyazaki's Lupin III anime film Castle of Cagliostro (1979).
 Finding ʻOhana, a 2021 Netflix film featuring an adventurous girl dragging her friends, and her disapproving brother, on an adventure to find pirate treasure. Several scenes from The Goonies are parodied, with the story taking place in Hawaii. Ke Huy Quan makes an appearance, as the character George Phan, parodying his "Slick shoes" dialogue.

References

External links 

 Official Archive Site - The Goonies (AE)
 
 
 
 
 
 

The Goonies
1980s American films
1985 films
Films about teenagers
1980s English-language films
1980s adventure comedy films
1980s buddy comedy films
1980s children's comedy films
1985 comedy films
Amblin Entertainment films
American adventure comedy films
American children's comedy films
Films directed by Richard Donner
Films with screenplays by Chris Columbus
Films with screenplays by Steven Spielberg
Films scored by Dave Grusin
Films set in Astoria, Oregon
Films shot in Astoria, Oregon
Films shot in Los Angeles County, California
Films shot in California
Films shot in Oregon
Films set in Oregon
Counterfeit money in film
Pirate films
Treasure hunt films
United States National Film Registry films
Warner Bros. films
Films about children
Comedy franchises